Baliangao, officially the Municipality of Baliangao, is a 5th class municipality in the province of Misamis Occidental, Philippines. According to the 2020 census, it has a population of 18,433 people.

The Baliangao Protected Landscape and Seascape area is located within the municipality.

Geography

Climate

Barangays
Baliangao is politically subdivided into 15 barangays.
 Del Pilar
 Landing
 Lumipac
 Lusot
 Mabini
 Magsaysay
 Misom
 Mitacas
 Naburos
 Northern Poblacion
 Punta Miray
 Punta Sulong
 Sinian
 Southern Poblacion
 Tugas

Demographics

Economy

References

External links
 [ Philippine Standard Geographic Code]
Philippine Census Information
Local Governance Performance Management System

Municipalities of Misamis Occidental
Misamis Occidental